Francesco Castellacci (born 4 April 1987 in Rome) is a professional racing driver from Italy. Francesco studied at Marymount International School, Rome and Universita' Bocconi before starting his career as a racing driver.

Together with Federico Leo, he won the drivers title of the 2011 FIA GT3 European Championship, driving a Ferrari 458 Italia GT3.

Career

Formula Azzurra
Castellacci began his single-seater career in late 2005, racing in the Formula Azzurra Winter Trophy. In the series' four races, all held at Adria International Raceway, he achieved two podium places to be classified in third place. In 2006, he entered the full Formula Azzurra championship, scoring 24 points to finish eighth in the final standings.

Formula Three
In late 2006, Castellacci tested a Formula Three car for the first time, driving for the British team Hitech Racing at Rockingham Motor Speedway. In 2007, he took part in the full British Formula 3 Championship season, racing alongside Australian driver John Martin at Alan Docking Racing. Castellacci failed to score a point in the 22 races he competed in, with his best result coming in the first race at Donington Park, where he finished in fifteenth position. He also took part in the Masters of Formula 3 race held at Zolder, finishing in 26th place.

The following year, Castellacci returned to his native Italy to compete in the Italian Formula Three Championship for Lucidi Motors. He finished the season fourth overall, taking six podium places along with a double pole position at the Monza round. The title was won by his team-mate Mirko Bortolotti.

Castellacci continued in the series for 2009, switching teams to join Prema Powerteam. He finished in the points on eleven occasions and took a single podium position at Misano to be classified in eighth place overall. During the year, he once again took part in the Masters of Formula Three event, this time racing for Manor Motorsport. He finished the race in 30th place.

Porsche Supercup
In June 2010, Castellacci made his debut in the Porsche Supercup round at the Valencia Street Circuit, finishing in 17th position. He is also due to contest the rounds at Silverstone, Hungaroring and Monza later in the season.

A month earlier, he also made his debut in the Porsche Carrera Cup Germany at Valencia's Circuit Ricardo Tormo, finishing in 14th place.

Other Series
In October 2009, Castellacci sampled a GP2 car for the first time during the first post-season test at Jerez. Driving for the Italian Durango team, he completed 107 laps during the course of the three-day test, recording a best time of 1:27.615 on the final day of running.

Castellacci also took part in Formula Renault 3.5 Series testing during October and November 2009, driving cars for Draco Racing, Interwetten.com Racing and Prema Powerteam.

For 2011, Castellacci raced in the FIA GT3 European Championship with AF Corse, sharing a Ferrari 458 with fellow Italian driver Federico Leo. The duo won the drivers' title at the final round of the season in Zandvoort.

Racing record

Career summary

† - As Castellacci is a guest driver, he is ineligible to score points.

Complete GT1 World Championship results

Complete FIA World Endurance Championship results

* Season still in progress.

Complete 24 Hours of Le Mans results

References

External links
 
 

1987 births
Living people
Racing drivers from Rome
Italian racing drivers
British Formula Three Championship drivers
Italian Formula Three Championship drivers
Formula Azzurra drivers
FIA GT1 World Championship drivers
Porsche Supercup drivers
Blancpain Endurance Series drivers
International GT Open drivers
24 Hours of Le Mans drivers
24 Hours of Spa drivers
FIA World Endurance Championship drivers
European Le Mans Series drivers
Prema Powerteam drivers
Aston Martin Racing drivers
Alan Docking Racing drivers
Manor Motorsport drivers
RC Motorsport drivers
AF Corse drivers
W Racing Team drivers
24H Series drivers
Le Mans Cup drivers
WeatherTech SportsCar Championship drivers
Porsche Carrera Cup Germany drivers